"King of Emotion" is a song by Scottish rock band Big Country, which was released in 1988 as the lead single from their fourth studio album Peace in Our Time. It was written by Stuart Adamson and produced by Peter Wolf. "King of Emotion" reached No. 16 in the UK, No. 11 on the Billboard Modern Rock Tracks and No. 20 on the Billboard Album Rock Tracks.

The song's music video was directed by Richard Lowenstein. It received breakout rotation on MTV. Recalling the song in the early 1990s, Adamson commented of the song being influenced by the Rolling Stones' "Honky Tonk Women": "There was a groove that suited us, so I thought why not go the whole hog and write our own song?" In 2002, the song was performed by British singer-songwriter Steve Harley (of Cockney Rebel) at the Stuart Adamson Tribute Concert.

Critical reception
Upon release, William Shaw of Smash Hits noted: "Big Country used to be the group whose tunes sounded all Scottish due to having billions of bagpipe-like guitars on them. This, on the other hand, is hip wiggling "rock" of the kind large crowds punch their fists into the air and shout "Awwwwwwwright" to. This is raunchy rock and ruddy roll, this is. Who are these imposters? Whoever they are, they've probably got a big hit on their hands." Mica Paris, as guest reviewer for Number One said: "This sounds like an album track. It's stronger than their old stuff but it's just not a single."

Cash Box commented: "A rough and ready rocker that has more elements of tough than tender. If Big Country sounded like guitars emulating bagpipes, this single sounds like guitars as axes, a decidedly heavier brushstroke here. Should score well on AOR." In his 2015 book The Top 40 Annual 1988, James Masterton noted: "Even two and a half decades later "King of Emotion" still has the capacity to annoy as it only takes one listen to realise just how much better it could have been."

In a retrospective review of the album, William Ruhlmann of AllMusic commented: "On songs like the "King of Emotion", Wolf sought to retain Big Country's heroic quality while adding the widescreen dramatic style and cheerleader choral approach of Starship's "We Built This City." It was a brave try, but didn't really suit the group."

Track listing
7" single
"King of Emotion" - 4:50
"The Travellers" - 3:16

7" single (US promo)
"King of Emotion (LP Version)" - 4:50
"King of Emotion (LP Version)" - 4:50

12" single
"King of Emotion" - 4:52
"The Travellers" - 3:14
"Starred & Crossed" - 4:26

12" single (Canada promo)
"King of Emotion" - 4:51
"King of Emotion" - 4:51

Cassette single (UK release)
"King of Emotion" - 4:51
"The Travellers" - 3:13
"Starred and Crossed" - 4:25
"On the Shore" - 3:38

CD single
"King of Emotion" - 4:51
"The Travellers" - 3:13
"Starred and Crossed" - 4:25
"Not Waving but Drowning" - 5:55

CD single (US promo)
"King of Emotion (LP Version)" - 4:50

Chart performance

Personnel
Big Country
Stuart Adamson - vocals, guitar
Bruce Watson - guitar
Tony Butler - bass
Mark Brzezicki - drums

Production
Peter Wolf - producer of "King of Emotion"
Big Country - producers of "The Travellers", "Starred & Crossed", "On the Shore" and "Not Waving But Drowning"

Other
Paul Harrison - front cover design
Andy Earl - front cover photography
Terry O'Neill - back cover photography
Grant/Edwards Management - management

References

1988 songs
1988 singles
Mercury Records singles
Reprise Records singles
Big Country songs
Songs written by Stuart Adamson